Damien Meslot (born 11 November 1964 in Belfort) is a French politician and a member of The Republicans. He represented Territoire de Belfort's 1st constituency in the National Assembly from 2002 to 2017, and has served as the mayor of Belfort since 2014.

References

External links

1964 births
Living people
Politicians from Belfort
Rally for the Republic politicians
Union for a Popular Movement politicians
The Republicans (France) politicians
Gaullism, a way forward for France
Mayors of places in Bourgogne-Franche-Comté
Deputies of the 12th National Assembly of the French Fifth Republic
Deputies of the 13th National Assembly of the French Fifth Republic
Deputies of the 14th National Assembly of the French Fifth Republic